Oddjob (often written as "Odd Job") is a fictional character in the espionage novels and films featuring James Bond. He is a henchman to the villain Auric Goldfinger in the 1959 James Bond novel Goldfinger and its 1964 film adaptation, making a cameo appearance in the mid-credits scene of Inspector Gadget (1999). In the film adaptation of Goldfinger, he was played by the Japanese-American actor and professional wrestler Harold Sakata. Oddjob, who also appears in the James Bond animated series and in several video games, is one of the most popular characters in the Bond series.

Appearances

Novel
Oddjob's real name is unknown. Goldfinger names him to describe his duties to his employer. A Korean, like all of Goldfinger's staff, he is extremely strong, as shown in one sequence where he breaks the thick oak railing of a staircase with a knife-hand strikes (colloquially known as 'karate chops') and shatters a mantel with his foot. When Bond expresses surprise at these feats, Goldfinger explains that Oddjob trains extensively to toughen the striking surfaces of his hands and feet, which have developed a tough callus, significantly increasing his striking power.

Oddjob is described as being a "squat" man with "arms like thighs", black teeth, and a "sickly zoo-smell". In contrast with the film, where he is depicted as a man of average height, the novel describes his breaking of a mantelpiece seven feet off the ground and six inches above his head, placing his height at 6 ft 6 in (198 cm). In an early edition, Oddjob is described as having a black belt in the Japanese martial art of karate, in later editions later we learn Oddjob practised taekwondo and hapkido in his native Korea but went onto earn his black belt in karate in Japan. The earlier novel tells of his hatred of being mistaken for Japanese, mainly due to Korean anger at the Japanese occupation during the Second World War.

Oddjob's signature weapon is a razor-edged bowler hat, which he wears at all times and can throw with deadly accuracy. He is also a skilled archer, able to fire an arrow through a ring as it is held aloft. Due to a cleft palate, he has a speech defect that renders his speech unintelligible to everyone except Goldfinger. In addition to killing people who might cause trouble for Goldfinger, Oddjob functions as his guard, chauffeur, and manservant (though not his golf caddy, as depicted in the film). He has a taste for cats as food, apparently acquired during a previous famine in Korea. When Bond frames Goldfinger's yellow cat for the destruction of the surveillance film, Goldfinger punishes it by letting Oddjob eat it for dinner.

He is killed when Bond uses a knife to shatter the window next to his seat on an aircraft, which depressurizes the plane and blows Oddjob out of the window, a fate transferred to Auric Goldfinger in the film version.

Film
At the beginning of Goldfinger, Oddjob is seen only as a silhouette against a wall as he knocks Bond unconscious at the Fontainebleau Hotel, after which he and/or Goldfinger kills Bond girl Jill Masterson, with whom Bond had spent the night, through "skin suffocation" by painting her entire body with gold paint.

When Bond meets Goldfinger for a round of golf, Oddjob is seen in full for the first time. Goldfinger describes him as "an admirable manservant but mute". He only has four lines of 'dialogue' throughout the film: in his first line, upon pretending to have found Goldfinger's missing golf ball, he exclaims, "Aha!". The second time, after killing Tilly Masterson, he instructs his men to dispose of her body by merely pointing at them and saying, "Ah! Ah!". The third time, he says "Ah!" to order Bond to put on a gas mask before entering Fort Knox. The fourth time, as Bond electrocutes him in Fort Knox, he yells a final long, loud "Arrgh!".

Oddjob acts as Goldfinger's personal chauffeur, bodyguard, and golf caddy. He wears a bowler hat with a sharpened steel rim, using it as a lethal weapon in the style of a chakram (an Indian throwing weapon) or a flying guillotine. It is powerful and capable of cutting through steel and decapitating a stone statue. He uses it to kill Tilly Masterson by breaking her neck.

Physically, Oddjob is extremely strong and resilient; he crushes a golf ball with one hand, and during the climactic fight scene with Bond, he is struck in the chest by a thrown gold bar and struck in the head with a wooden object used as a club. He barely flinches after both these attacks. However, he is never mentioned to be a karate expert. He is also fanatically loyal to Goldfinger and his plot, as he is willing to die in the nuclear explosion in Fort Knox rather than allow the bomb's disarmament.

Oddjob's demeanor remains constant throughout the film. He smiles broadly whenever he encounters Bond, even during their fight scene. The only time he shows anything resembling fear or wariness is when Bond attempts to use Oddjob's hat against him. Oddjob dodges the hat, causing it to get stuck between a pair of metal bars. When he retrieves his hat and tries to free it, Bond grabs a sparking wire severed by the hat earlier and thrusts the open end onto the bars. The electric current transfers to the bars and then to the metal in the hat's rim, which electrocutes Oddjob to death. When asked what happened to him, Bond replies, "he blew a fuse".

In a mid-credits scene of Inspector Gadget (1999), Oddjob is seen at a "Minions Anonymous" meeting, along with Jaws; he is credited as "Famous Villain With Deadly Hat".

Other appearances
Oddjob appears in the animated series James Bond Jr. with a miniature top hat (in place of the customary bowler hat), sunglasses, and hip-hop style clothes (not only does he wear purple instead of black, but he wears more casual attire as opposed to his live-action counterpart's dress suit), revealing that the electric shock did not kill him, but knocked him unconscious. The Americans arrest him before he escapes again in the series. When not wearing his hat, his hair is now more flat-top. Like his movie counterpart, he rarely speaks.

In the video game James Bond 007, Oddjob appears as a henchman for the main villain, General Golgov. Bond encounters Oddjob at his hotel room in Marrakesh. The two fight and Bond is defeated and left stranded in a desert. Later on, Bond trails Oddjob to Tibet, only to be captured. Bond escapes confinement and obtains a shield to protect him from Oddjob's hats, which he uses to deflect back at him. In this game, Oddjob speaks.

In the video game GoldenEye: Rogue Agent, Oddjob is a henchman of Goldfinger and initially a companion of GoldenEye. He is killed when GoldenEye tosses him over a rail into a pit inside the Hoover Dam after he turns on his employer and attacks GoldenEye.

Oddjob appears in the James Bond video games GoldenEye 007 and 007: Nightfire as a playable character for use in multiplayer modes. His short stature in Goldeneye made him infamously hard to hit and often banned as a House rule. In Nightfire, he can use his hat as a unique throwing weapon that returns after 30 seconds. Oddjob is also a playable multiplayer character in the 2010 remake game GoldenEye 007.

In Dynamite Entertainment's ongoing comic book title James Bond 007, a new iteration of Oddjob is featured who is envisioned as a South Korean secret agent and a successor to another Oddjob (with Harold Sakata's likeness), initially acting as a rival spy to Bond in a mutual assignment. His given name is John Lee.

Oddjob's hat
The prop used in Goldfinger by Oddjob was made by British hat makers, Lock & Co. The hat was then adapted by inserting a chakram into the brim. John Stears was responsible for making the hat fly.
 
After Goldfinger, the hat came into the possession of the James Bond Fan Club. In 1998, the hat was auctioned at Christie's in a sale of James Bond memorabilia. The hat sold for £62,000. In 2002, the hat was lent out for an exhibition at the National Museum of Photography, Film and Television in Bradford, commemorating the 40th anniversary of the release of Dr. No. The hat was then auctioned again in 2006, when the final price was $36,000.
 
Replicas of the hat are sought after by collectors and replicas have been used as centrepieces for some exhibitions. In 2008, one replica joined the Bond exhibition at the National Motor Museum.

The television show MythBusters tested out the capabilities of Oddjob's hat, testing whether or not it would have been able to decapitate a stone statue. It failed to do so, and the Mythbusters ultimately labeled it 'Busted'.

Oddjob's lethal hat was ranked tenth in a 2008 20th Century Fox poll for the most popular movie weapon, which surveyed approximately 2,000 films fans.

Homages and parodies

Film
 In the 1982 film Bruce contre-attaque, Harold Sakata appears as a villainous character who reprises Oddjob's deadly hat weapon.
 The Hong Kong film Aces Go Places 3 features an appearance by an Oddjob-like character, played by Tsuneharu Sugiyama.
 In the film Austin Powers: International Man of Mystery, Oddjob is parodied by a character called Random Task, played by Joe Son, who throws his shoe as a weapon.
 In the Norwegian parody film Kill Buljo, Buljo's bodyguard is named Blow Job (played by strongwoman and powerlifter Heidi Nilima Monsen) – a tough woman dressed in black suit and bowler hat. Her favorite activity is throwing cops around. 
 In The Kentucky Fried Movies kung-fu spoof, A Fistful of Yen, Dr. Klahn's army is training by throwing razored bowler hats to decapitate a statue, just like Oddjob. 
 Oddjob's trademark hat-throwing technique can also be seen in Toy Story 2 (in which Mr. Potato Head throws his own bowler hat to prevent two doors from closing).
 In the Italian parody film Two Mafiosi Against Goldfinger, the equivalent of Oddjob is a huge black man called Molok (played by ex-wrestler Dakar) dressed in a black suit and bowler hat, who throws a deadly shoe to kill his opponents.

Television
 Harold Sakata appeared in several Vicks 44 commercials as Oddjob. The ads show him inadvertently breaking several objects via coughing fits, only to have his rampages halted by taking doses of the featured product.
 In the animated special Garfield's Feline Fantasies, Garfield has an extended fantasy featuring himself as a James Bond-like spy, accompanied by his sidekick, "Slobberjob", played by Odie.
 In the animated series DuckTales, a henchman named Oddduck accompanies the villain of the episode "Double-O-Duck", Dr. Nogood.
 In the cartoon series Count Duckula, a villain called The Egg has a manservant called Oddbeak (a parrot made to resemble Oddjob, complete with bowler and suit).
 In the Chip 'n Dale Rescue Rangers episode "Double 'O Dale", which parodies the Bond series, Dale is watching a spy movie featuring a sidekick called Oddshoe. 
 In The Super Mario Bros. Super Show! episode "On Her Majesty's Sewer Service", a parody of the James Bond series, the character Mouser gains an appearance similar to Oddjob, even throwing his bowler derby hat as a weapon in one scene (instead of cutting people, though, the bowler derby was shown to simply bludgeon them). 
 In Beavis and Butt-head, when the duo are watching a music video with people riding motorcycles, they say it is like a James Bond film, with Beavis adding "They need that short guy Handjob to come out."
 In The Beverly Hillbillies, Jethro Bodine sees some of the James Bond films, referring to them as 'Double-Naught Spy' movies, and becomes enamored of Oddjob's bowler hat, dunking his own hat into molten metal and letting it harden.
 In the cartoon series Duck Dodgers, Daffy Duck throws a hat to save himself during a mission and later says that he had learned it from someone called "Odd Ball". It cuts to a scene where Oddjob angrily says, "Odd Ball?!!".
 In the episode "The Spy Who Mugged Me" of The A-Team, a parody on the Bond franchise, the character Fröbe is a spoof on Oddjob, played by Professor Tanaka. The name of the character refers to the name of the actor playing Auric Goldfinger in the original Bond film, Gert Fröbe.
 In the Animaniacs segment "The Chicken Who Loved Me", the villain, Dr. Not, has a henchman named Day Laborer who resembles Oddjob.
 In Robot Chicken, Oddjob's hat is blown by the wind while he is reading a newspaper, he chases it down as it goes around cutting things in half.

Video games
 One of the characters in the video game Fur Fighters is a hat-throwing bear called Oddfelt.
 In the Mortal Kombat video game franchise, recurring character Kung Lao's throwable hat was inspired by Oddjob.
 The arcade game Sly Spy, an homage to the James Bond mythos, features a bowler-throwing character as a level boss.

Other
 In the Italian Disney 1966 comic story "Paperino missione Bob Fingher" (translated for the United States in 2010 as "Moldfinger or The Spy Who Ducked-Out On Me"), parody of the movie's Italian edition, Agente 007 – Missione Goldfinger (literally: "Agent 007 – Goldfinger Mission'"), the evil Bob Fingher has a shoe with Oddjob's hat's functions and loves to play golf.
 In a one-page Hostess advertisement, Spider-Man fights a supervillain called "Demolition Derby" who throws his derby hat that bounces and cuts Spider-Man's webbing.
 In Daredevil #59, a supervillain called Torpedo throws a cutting hat; Daredevil remarks that he did not expect Torpedo to pull an "oddjob" on him.
 In an official Bond tie-in ad for Heineken beer with Daniel Craig, the Bond girl throws a hat at their pursuers just like Oddjob, but without the same hit success rate.
 In the Japanese manga JoJo's Bizarre Adventures first part, Phantom Blood, the character Robert Edward O. Speedwagon has a bowler with blades hidden within the brim, a clear reference to Oddjob's signature weapon.

Footnotes

References

Bond villains
Literary characters introduced in 1959
Fictional archers
Fictional blade and dart throwers
Fictional contract killers
Fictional henchmen
Fictional karateka
Fictional taekwondo practitioners
Fictional hapkido practitioners
Fictional Korean people
Fictional mute characters
Male literary villains
Male film villains
Action film villains
Film supervillains